Louhisaari Manor ( or ) is a historic baroque manor house in Askainen in the municipality of Masku, Western Finland Province, Finland. The mansion is the birthplace and childhood home of Carl Gustaf Emil Mannerheim, Finnish military leader, statesman and sixth president of Finland (1944–1946).

History

The Fleming family acquired the Louhisaari estate around the middle of the 15th century. The Louhisaari Flemings held prominent offices in the kingdom of Sweden (including Finland). , admiral and governor of Finland, constructed the manor in 1655. After three hundred years, the financially pressed Fleming family had to sell the house.

The Mannerheim family acquired the manor in 1795. Known residents were Carl Gustaf Mannerheim, a Finnish entomologist and governor of the Viipuri province, and his grandson Marshal Carl Gustaf Emil Mannerheim, who was born here in 1867. Baroness Wilhelmina Mannerheim moved to Sweden and sold the house to Oskar Hannus in 1903. A charity committee in honour of Marshal Mannerheim purchased the mansion and donated it Finnish State in 1965, which opened it as a museum for visitors in 1967. The museum gives a good presentation of the ways of life of people in Finland from to the 17th to the 19th centuries.

Architecture & design

The house is a fine and rare example of a Palladian-style country house in Finland. The architect is unknown, but some presume Herman Fleming, the owner, to be the builder and designer. During its history, the buildings (manor and annexes) more or less remained in their original form, but were subject to renovations and repair. During the restoration of the 1960s, the exterior was restored back to its 17th century style as much as possible. The first and third floor of the manor were also restored in 17th century style, while the second floor was brought back to the 18th and 19th century design.

The house is surrounded by a park in English landscape style.

Gallery

References

External links

 https://www.kansallismuseo.fi/en/louhisaari/frontpage   Website of the Finnish Heritage Agency
 https://www.visitnaantali.com/en/louhisaari-manor   Information on the tourism website of Naantali
 http://www.visitcastles.eu/ The Association of Castles and Museums around the Baltic Sea

Manor houses in Finland
Houses completed in 1655
Carl Gustaf Emil Mannerheim